The Ibero-American Exposition of 1929 (Spanish: Exposición iberoamericana de 1929) was a world's fair held in Seville, Spain, from 9 May 1929 until 21 June 1930. Countries in attendance of the exposition included: Portugal, the United States, Brazil, Uruguay, Mexico, Peru, Argentina, Chile, the Republic of Colombia, Cuba, Venezuela, the Dominican Republic, Bolivia, Panama, El Salvador, Costa Rica, and Ecuador. Each Spanish region and each of the provinces of Andalusia were also represented. Spain’s Dictator General Miguel Primo de Rivera gave the opening address. Primo de Rivera allowed the Spanish King Alfonso XIII to give the final words and officially open the exposition. The purpose of the exposition was to improve relations between Spain and the countries in attendance, all of which have historical ties with Spain through colonization (parts of Spanish America and the United States) or political union (Portugal and its former colony Brazil). Other countries were represented at the International section in Barcelona.
 
The exposition was smaller in scale than the International Exposition held in Barcelona during that same year, but it was not lacking in style. The city of Seville had prepared for the Exposition over the course of 19 years.  The exhibition buildings were constructed in María Luisa Park along the Guadalquivir River. A majority of the buildings were built to remain permanent after the closing of the exposition.  Many of the foreign buildings, including the United States exhibition building, were to be used as consulates after the closing of the exhibits. By the opening of the exposition all of the buildings were complete, although many were no longer new. Not long before the opening of the Exposition, the Spanish government also began a modernization of the city in order to prepare for the expected crowds by erecting new hotels and widening the medieval streets to allow for the movement of automobiles.

Spanish pavilions and exhibits 

Spain spent a large amount of money in developing its exhibits for the fair and constructed elaborate buildings to hold them. The exhibits were designed to show the social and economic progress of Spain as well as expressing its culture. Spanish architect Aníbal González designed the largest and most famous of the buildings, which surrounded the Plaza de España. The largest of the exhibits housed in this building was located in the “Salón del Descubrimento de América.” The Salón contained documents, maps, and other objects related to the discovery of the Americas, including a set of 120 letters and manuscript that had belonged to Christopher Columbus, the last testament of Hernán Cortés, and detailed dioramas of historic moments. An exact replica of Columbus's ship the "Santa María," complete with a costumed crew, floated on the Guadalquivir River. The cities of Spain contributed structures designed to reflect their unique cultures to be placed in the "Pabellones de las regiones españolas" ("Pavilions of the Spanish regions").  Spain’s exhibits also included a large collection of art located in the Palacio Mudéjar ("Mudéjar art palace"), Palacio Renacimiento ("Renaissance palace"), and the Palacio de la Casa Real ("Palace of the Royal House"). The Institute of Art from the University of Seville was moved to the Palacio Mudéjar for the duration of the exposition on the permission gained from the exposition committee by Count Columbi. The committee also set aside funds from their budget to purchase materials for the Institute.

United States exhibits 

The United States' contribution to the exposition consisted of three buildings and marked the end to a several year period in which the United States did not construct buildings for foreign expositions. The main building was to serve as the U.S. consulate office after the closing of the Ibero-American exposition, and housed a menagerie of electrical appliances including oil furnaces, electric refrigerators, airplane models, and miniature wind tunnels. The other two structures housed a movie theatre and government exhibits, including contributions from the Departments of Agriculture, Treasury, and Labor, the Commission of Fine Arts, the Navy, and the Library of Congress.

Ibero-American exhibits 
Of the Ibero-American nations in attendance of the exposition, 10 constructed pavilions to display their exhibits. Other nations, including Bolivia, Panama, El Salvador, Costa Rica, and Ecuador displayed their native products in the "Galerías comerciales americanas" ("Commercial galleries of the Americas").

The largest of the ten pavilions was the Peruvian pavilion, which was designed by the architect Don Manuel Piqueras Cotolí. The pavilion contained a large archeology collection consisting of three halls filled with pre-Columbian era artifacts, which were to be kept on permanent display. The pavilion also contained an agricultural exhibit filled with stuffed vicuñas, alpacas, llamas, and guanacos.  The exhibit was complemented by a pack of live llamas grazing on the pavilion grounds.

The Republic of Colombia constructed a pavilion designed by Seville architect José Granados. The pavilion included a collection of sculpture and artwork by Colombian artist Rómulo Rozo, and of Colombian emeralds, and a coffee café that demonstrated all of the steps in coffee cultivation.

The Brazilian pavilion also contained a coffee cultivation exhibit complete with panoramas and models illustrating the different phases of cultivation. Architect Pedro Paulo Bernardes Bastos designed the pavilion, which also included a coffee bar.

Chilean architect  designed the three-story building that served as home to Chile's exhibits. The exhibits included displays of Chilean industries, including detailed replicas of a nitrate mine and a copper plant, Araucanian arts and crafts, and galleries displaying Chilean art and history.

The Mexican pavilion, designed by Manuel Amabilis, included exhibits on archeology, education, and the history of Spanish accomplishments in Mexico. Students in Mexican schools prepared some of the education exhibits.

Architect Martin Noel designed Argentina's pavilion, which included a movie theatre and displays focusing on Argentinean industries and products.

Uruguay's pavilion included displays of its industrial schools, including the Institute of Agronomy and an art gallery filled with paintings and bronze sculptures.

Cuba contributed demonstrations of the sugar and tobacco industries to the exposition in their pavilion.

The Dominican Republic pavilion included a reproduction of the Columbus's Alcázar.

Guatemala signed up late for the exhibition and as a result rather than resembling a huge palace its pavilion looks more like a school portable building with blue and white tiles on the front. The building contained exhibits relating to the resources found in Guatemala.

Venezuela also erected a pavilion containing displays of its resources.

Today, many of the pavilions from the exposition remain, notably the famous Plaza de España, which chronicles each of the regions of Spain in ceramic provincial alcoves and benches, as well as some of the national pavilions, which have now been converted to Consulate-Generals. Many of the buildings have been converted into museums and the pavilion of Argentina is now a flamenco school. They have also been featured in a number of films, including Lawrence of Arabia, The Wind and the Lion, and Star Wars: Episode II – Attack of the Clones, among others.

For Sevillans, the exposition marked the acceptance by the upper class of the traje de flamenca, an outfit worn by lower-class women.

See also 
 Barcelona Pavilion designed by Ludwig Mies van der Rohe, was the German Pavilion for the 1929 International Exposition in Barcelona, Spain.

The Exposition is reviewed by Evelyn Waugh in his collected travel writings, 'When The Going Was Good' 1946, Duckworth. See 'A Pleasure Cruise in 1929'.

References 

 Martin, Percy Alvin. (1931) "The Ibero-American Exposition at Seville." Vol. 11, No. 3. The Hispanic American Historical Review.
 "Seville Exposition." (20 May 2009) Time Magazine. Retrieved on 4 March 2009.
 "A Seminar in the History of Art at the University of Seville." (1930) Vol. 3. No. 1. Parnassuss.
 Williams, Mark. (1990) The Story of Spain. Malaga, Spain: Santana Books.
 Richman, Irving Berdine. (1919) The Spanish Conquerors: A Chronicle of the Dawn of Empire Overseas. New Haven, CT: Yale University Press.

World's fairs in Seville
1929 in Spain
20th century in Seville
Arts in Spain